The 1916 World Series was the championship series in Major League Baseball for the 1916 season. The 13th edition of the World Series, it matched the  American League champion Boston Red Sox against the National League champion Brooklyn Robins. The Red Sox won the Series four games to one. It was the first World Series meeting between the teams.

Casey Stengel shone on offense for the Robins in the 1916 Series, but the Red Sox pitching corps ultimately proved too much for the denizens of Flatbush. As with the  Series, the Red Sox played their home games at the larger Braves Field, and it paid off as they drew a then-record 43,620 people for the final game.

Brooklyn fielded some strong teams under their manager and namesake Wilbert Robinson in the late 1910s. The Robins, also interchangeably called the Dodgers, would win the pennant again in 1920, but the American League teams were generally stronger during that interval.

The two franchises met again in the postseason for the first time in 102 years in the 2018 World Series, 60 years after the Dodgers relocated to Los Angeles. The record for most innings played in a World Series game, set by Game 2 in 1916, at 14, was broken by Game 3 in 2018, at 18. Just like their first matchup in the World Series, the Red Sox would eventually go on to defeat the Dodgers in five games to win their ninth World Series championship overall and fourth World Series championship since 2004.

Summary

Matchups

Game 1

Until the ninth, Boston starter Ernie Shore was in control. Holding a comfortable 6–1 lead, a walk, hit batter, error and bases-loaded walk to Fred Merkle finally forced the Red Sox to call on Carl Mays from the bullpen to preserve a 6–5 win.

Game 2

The Robins scored in the top of the first on an inside-the-park home run by Hy Myers, and the Red Sox tied it in the bottom of the third, Ruth himself knocking in the run with a ground ball. The game remained 1–1 until the bottom of the 14th, when the Red Sox won it on a pinch-hit single by Del Gainer.  The 14-inning game set a World Series record for longest game by innings.  That mark was equaled in Game 3 of the 2005 World Series between the Chicago White Sox and Houston Astros, and then again in Game 1 of the 2015 World Series between the Kansas City Royals and New York Mets, before being broken in Game 3 of the 2018 World Series between the Red Sox and Dodgers.

Game 3

A seventh-inning home run by Larry Gardner chased Brooklyn starter Jack Coombs and brought Boston to within one run. Jeff Pfeffer came through with  innings of hitless relief to save the victory for Coombs.

Game 4

Brooklyn's first three batters reached safely off Dutch Leonard in a two-run first inning, but that's all the Dodgers would get. Larry Gardner's second home run in two days was an inside-the-park one to left-center that scored two teammates ahead of him, giving Leonard all he would need for the win.

Game 5

The final game was over in a snappy 1 hour, 43 minutes. Ernie Shore threw a three-hitter. Boston scratched out a run on a walk, sacrifice bunt, ground-out and passed ball. The Red Sox added more in the third, thanks to an error and a Chick Shorten RBI single, and the fifth when Harry Hooper singled and scored on a Hal Janvrin double. Casey Stengel led off the Dodger ninth with a hit, but Shore allowed no more. For the second straight series, Red Sox pitching dominated, this time holding the Robins to a team .200 batting average, contributing to an easy 5-game victory.

Composite line score
1916 World Series (4–1): Boston Red Sox (A.L.) over Brooklyn Robins (N.L.)

Notes

References

Further reading

External links

World Series
World Series
Boston Red Sox postseason
Brooklyn Dodgers postseason
World Series
World Series
1910s in Boston
World Series
Baseball competitions in Boston
Baseball competitions in New York City
1910s in Brooklyn
Flatbush, Brooklyn